John Kellock Robertson, FRSC (1885 – June 24, 1958) was a Canadian physicist who taught at Queen's University at Kingston. A pioneer of physics teaching to medical students, he was president of the Royal Society of Canada for 1944–1945.

Early life and education 
Born in Perth, Ontario, Robertson was educated at the University of Toronto.

Career 
Robertson joined Queen's University at Kingston as a lecturer in 1909, where he remained his whole career, with the exception of periods of research in England at the Cavendish Laboratory and Imperial College London. He was named a fellow of the American Physical Society in 1921.

Personal life 
Robertson retired to England in 1951 and died in Canada in 1958.

References

External Links 
 Physics for physicians: integrating science into the medical curriculum, 1910-1950
 Obituary, British Institute of Radiology

1885 births
1958 deaths
Fellows of the Royal Society of Canada
Academic staff of Queen's University at Kingston
20th-century Canadian physicists
Fellows of the American Physical Society
People from Perth, Ontario
University of Toronto alumni